La Racha is Cuca third album, recorded in 1995, in Zurich, Switzerland.

In this record, José Fors left the band to dedicate himself to painting. His brother, Alfonso Fors "Animalf", took the vocal duties instead. However, his career with the band would be short, since José returned for the next album.

Track listing

Singles and videos  
 Insecticida al Suicida

1995 albums
Cuca (band) albums